Lhedang  is a town in Bumthang District in the north-eastern region of Bhutan.

References

External links 
 Satellite map at Maplandia.com

Populated places in Bhutan